The Daimler-Benz DB 603 was a German aircraft engine used during World War II. It was a liquid-cooled 12-cylinder inverted V12 enlargement of the DB 601, which was in itself a development of the DB 600. Production of the DB 603 commenced in May 1942, and with a 44.5 liter (44,500 cc) displacement figure, was the largest displacement inverted V12 aviation engine to be produced and used in front line aircraft of the Third Reich during World War II.

The DB 603 powered several aircraft, including the Do 217 N&M, Do 335, He 219, Me 410, BV 155 and Ta 152C.

Design and development

The Mercedes-Benz T80 land speed record car, designed by aircraft engineer Josef Mickl with assistance from Ferdinand Porsche and top German Grand Prix racing driver Hans Stuck, incorporated the third prototype DB 603. It was set up for the land speed record run attempt to operate on an exotic fuel mix based on a 63% methanol, 16% benzene and 12% ethanol content, with minor percentages of acetone, nitrobenzene, avgas and ether. Due to the outbreak of the war in September 1939, the T80 (nicknamed Schwarzer Vogel, "Black Bird") never raced. The DB 603 engine was removed from the vehicle for use in fighter aircraft.

As Germany's largest displacement inverted V12 aviation powerplant in production during the war years, the DB 603 saw wide operational use as the primary engine type for many twin and multi-engined combat aircraft designs — the promising twin-engined Dornier Do 335 Pfeil prototype heavy fighter, the front-line Messerschmitt Me 410 Hornisse heavy fighter and Heinkel He 219 Uhu twin-engined night fighter were all designed for DB 603 power. The Dornier Do 217M and -N medium bomber and night fighter subtypes powered by inline engines, and the enormous sixty-metre wingspan, six-engined Blohm & Voss BV 238 flying boat prototype, essentially had their DB 603 powerplants installed within  what appeared to be the same unitized complete engine/cowl/radiator assembly as a complete unit-replaceable "power system" for twin and multi-engined aircraft — this particular design featured a "chin"-style radiator installation directly beneath the crankcase, and the oil cooler placed on the dorsal portion of the installation for the earlier examples, as the BV 238 had no visible upper-cowl openings for engine cooling of any sort for its half-dozen unitized DB 603s.  The He 219 airframe pioneered what is believed to be a Heinkel-specific Kraftei unitized engine package for the DB 603 engine using a well-streamlined annular radiator set for primary engine cooling between the propeller and its reduction gear housing with a nearly-cylindrical cowl behind it, pierced only by the twin rows of six exhaust stacks, one row per side. The characteristic portside-cowl supercharger intake for Daimler-Benz inverted V12s was usually accommodated away from the nacelle's sheetmetal itself for the Heinkel/DB 603 unitized engine package, most often within the airframe's wing panel design.  The same Kraftei packaging for the He 219 was also used for powering the four-engined prototype He 177B strategic bomber series, and with an added turbocharger in each nacelle, the six ordered (two completed) prototypes of Heinkel's He 274 high-altitude strategic bomber project.

Variants

Production versions

DB 603A, rated altitude of 5.7 km, B4 fuel
Power (take-off): 1750 PS (1726 hp, 1287 kW) at 2700 rpm at sea level
Combat power: 1580 PS (1558 hp, 1162 kW) at 2500 rpm at sea level
DB 603AA DB 603A with an improved supercharger, rated altitude of 7.3 km, B4 fuel
Power (take-off): 1670 PS (1647 hp, 1228 kW) at 2700 rpm at sea level
Combat power: 1580 PS (1558 hp, 1162 kW) at 2500 rpm at sea level
DB 603E rated altitude of 7.0 km, B4 fuel
Power (take-off): 1800 PS (1775 hp, 1324 kW) at 2700 rpm at sea level
Combat power: 1575 PS (1553 hp, 1158 kW) at 2500 rpm at sea level

Prototypes and other versions
DB 603D, a DB 603A with propellers rotating counter-clockwise; production unknown
DB 603F, a DB 603E with propellers rotating counter-clockwise; production unknown
DB 603G (production cancelled)
Power (max): 1900 PS (1874 hp, 1397 kW) at 2700 rpm at sea level
Combat power: 1560 PS (1539 hp, 1147 kW) at 2700 rpm at sea level
DB 603L/LA (prototype with two-stage supercharger, B4 fuel)
Power (max): 2000 PS (1973 hp, 1471 kW)
DB 603L/M two-stage supercharger, rated altitude of 10.5 km, C3 fuel
Power (take-off): 2450 PS (2416 hp, 1801 kW) at 3000 rpm at sea level
Combat power: 2100 PS (2071 hp, 1544 kW) at 2700 rpm at sea level
DB 603N (prototype with two-stage supercharger, C3 fuel)
Power (take-off): 3000PS (2958 hp, 2206 kW) at 3200 rpm at sea level
Power (max): 2570 PS (2762 hp, 2059 kW) at 3000 rpm at sea level
Continuous: 1930 PS (1904 hp, 1420 kW) at 2700 rpm at sea level
DB 603S (DB 603A with experimental TK-11 turbo-supercharger) - Intended (not known if actually used) for the Heinkel He 274 prototype airframes.
Power (max): Not known.

DB 613 Coupled side-by-side DB 603s, meant to replace the DB 606 and DB 610, in prototype form only from March 1940 through 1943 and weighing an estimated 1.8 tonnes apiece.
Power (max): Estimated at some 3,854 PS (2,833 kW, 3,800 hp) each per "power system".
DB 614 a 2000 PS development.
DB 615 Coupled DB 614 engines
DB 617 A long-range derivative of the DB 603
DB 618 Coupled DB 617 engines
DB 622 A DB 603 with a two-stage supercharger and single-stage turbocharger
DB 623 A DB 603 with twin turbochargers
DB 624 A DB 603 with a two-stage supercharger and single-stage turbocharger
DB 626 A DB 603 with twin turbochargers and intercooler
DB 627 The DB 603 fitted with a two-stage supercharger and after-cooler.
DB 631 An abandoned three stage supercharged DB 603G.
DB 632 A projected development of the DB 603N with contra-rotating propellers.
MB 509 Development as a tank engine for the super-heavy Panzerkampfwagen Maus

All power data is given in metric horsepower as stated per manufacturer. Power (max) is Takeoff and Emergency power (5-min-rating), combat power is climb and combat power (30-min rating), continuous is without time limit.

Applications
 Blohm & Voss BV 155
 Blohm & Voss BV 238
 Dornier Do 217
 Dornier Do 335
 Fiat G.56 - two prototypes flown
 Focke-Wulf Fw 190C - experimental installation
 Focke-Wulf Ta 152C - the medium altitude/ground-attack variant of the Ta 152
 Heinkel He 177B - prototype aircraft series
 Heinkel He 219
 Heinkel He 274
 Henschel Hs 130 - two DB 603s, supercharged by a single DB 605T engine driving HZ-Anlage  supercharger in fuselage
 Macchi MC.207 - experimental installation, not flown
 Messerschmitt Me 410
 Reggiane Re.2006- experimental installation, not flown

Land vehicles
 Mercedes-Benz T80
 Panzerkampfwagen VIII Maus

Specifications (DB 603A)

See also

References

Notes

Bibliography

 Jane's Fighting Aircraft of World War II. London. Studio Editions Ltd, 1989. 
 Neil Gregor Daimler-Benz in the Third Reich. Yale University Press, 1998

External links

 Aviation History.com, DB 600 series page

Daimler-Benz aircraft engines
1940s aircraft piston engines
Inverted V12 aircraft engines